The LPGA Volvik Championship was a women's professional golf tournament on the LPGA Tour. A new event in 2016, it was played in Michigan at Travis Pointe Country Club, southwest of Ann Arbor.

Volvik is a manufacturer of colored golf balls, headquartered in South Korea.

Course layout
Travis Pointe Country Club

Winners

Tournament records

References

External links

LPGA official tournament microsite
Travis Pointe Country Club – official site

Former LPGA Tour events
Golf in Michigan
Sports in Ann Arbor, Michigan
Recurring sporting events established in 2016
Recurring sporting events disestablished in 2018
2016 establishments in Michigan
2018 disestablishments in Michigan
Women's sports in Michigan